Nomadic center (also Romanized as Maḥal Chādarhāy ʿAshāīry Dū Rāhī Pakht) is a village and nomadic center in Momenabad Rural District, in the Central District of Sarbisheh County, South Khorasan Province, Iran. At the 2006 census, its population was 30, in 9 families.

References 

Populated places in Sarbisheh County